French is an official language in 29 independent nations. The following is a list of sovereign states and territories where French is an official or de facto language.

Only official language

Countries
List of countries where French is the only official language:

 Burkina Faso
 Congo
 Democratic Republic of Congo
 Ivory Coast
 France (Metropolitan France and Overseas France)
 Gabon
 Guinea
 Mali
 Monaco
 Niger
 Senegal
 Togo

Non-sovereign entities
 Geneva, Switzerland
 Jura, Switzerland
 Neuchâtel, Switzerland
 Quebec, Canada
 Vaud, Switzerland

Co-official use

Sovereign states
In many countries, French is used as a co-official language alongside one or more other languages.
List of countries where French is a co-official language:

 Benin
 Belgium
 Burundi
 Cameroon
 Canada
 Chad
 Central African Republic
 Comoros
 Djibouti
 Equatorial Guinea
 Haiti
 Luxembourg
 Madagascar
 Rwanda
 Seychelles
 Switzerland
 Vanuatu

National subdivisions

 Aosta Valley
 Bern
 Brussels
 Fribourg
 Jersey
 New Brunswick
 Northwest Territories
 Nunavut
 Puducherry
 Valais
 Wallonia
 Yukon

Officially recognized status
List of countries and dependencies that grant certain constitutional rights to the French language:
 Guernsey
 Lebanon
 Mauritius
 Louisiana

Intergovernmental organizations

French is an official language, mostly in conjunction with English, of 36 international organisations. These include:

Countries
This table shows the total populations of the countries, not the number of French speakers (some of these countries such as Canada have a majority that do not speak French).

Dependent entities

Note: Réunion, Guadeloupe, Martinique, French Guiana and Mayotte are classified as overseas regions of France and are thus not a part of this list.

Minority in other countries

See also 
 Geographical distribution of French speakers
 Francophonie
 List of international organisations which have French as an official language

References